Acanthodactylus khamirensis is a species of lizard in the family Lacertidae. The species is endemic to Iran.

Geographic range
A. khamirensis is found in Hormozgan Province in southern Iran.

References

Further reading
Heidari, Nastaran; Rastegar-Pouyani, Nasrullah; Rastegar-Pouyani, Eskandar; Rjabizadeh, Mehdi (2013). "A new species of Acanthodactylus Fitzinger 1834 (Sauria: Lacertidae) from southern Iran". Zootaxa 3722 (3): 333–346. (Acanthodactylus khamirensis, new species).

Acanthodactylus
Reptiles described in 2013
Taxa named by Nastaran Heidari
Taxa named by Eskandar Rastegar Pouyani
Taxa named by Nasrullah Rastegar Pouyani
Taxa named by Mehdi Rajabizadeh